McKeag is a surname. Notable people with the surname include:

Anna Jane McKeag (1864–1947), American psychologist and college president
Billy McKeag (born 1945), Northern Irish footballer
Gordon McKeag (1928–2005), English solicitor and sports executive
Stephen McKeag (1970–2000), Northern Irish loyalist 
William McKeag (1897–1972), British politician, soldier and solicitor
William John McKeag (1928–2007), Canadian politician